Hovtinden is a mountain in Oscar II Land at Spitsbergen, Svalbard. It has a height of 575 m.a.s.l. and is located on the ridge of Värmlandryggen. Other peaks along the ridge are Klaratoppen, Karlstadtoppen and Svenskegga.

References

Mountains of Spitsbergen